Boden is a British clothing retailer selling primarily online and by mail order and catalogue. It was founded by Johnnie Boden in 1991 as a mail-order business. The company sells in several countries, with websites for the United Kingdom, the United States, Germany, and Australia. The value of Boden has been estimated at £300 million.  In 2015, Boden (which at the time had one outlet store in Park Royal, London) announced plans to open a number of physical stores.

History 

The company was founded in 1991 by Johnnie Boden, initially launched with eight menswear products. Womenswear was introduced in 1992. Childrenswear range Mini Boden was introduced in 1996 by Kate Barton who then became the chief designer. The UK website was launched in April 1999. In 2002, the company expanded to America, with a website which now accounts for one third of total sales, which in 2012 were $150m. Boden's first shop opened in 2004 in Hanger Lane, London. In 2007, the brand launched a baby range and also launched the German website. In the summer of 2010, the teen range ‘Johnnie B' was created, with sizing up to 16 years old. In the summer of 2011, a maternity range was launched as well as a petite range for Boden Womenswear. Limited Edition online sections were later introduced including a Mini Boden "Party dress" range, with dresses and accessories for weddings. In 2014 the company launched an Australian website.

Products 

The company designs bright, patterned clothes as well as casual basics. Its collections are made up of the Boden range for men and women, Johnnie B for older children and teenagers 9 – 16, Mini Boden for girls and boys aged 1 1/2–12, Baby Boden for newborns to three-year-olds and the maternity range; new collections are launched every spring and autumn, with further lines added in summer and winter.

Financial performance 
In the summer of 2007, with more than a million regular customers, Boden announced a 60% rise in profits as its sales increased by 25% to £128.5m.  Figures for 2011 were a turnover of £245 million, up 6% on the previous year. The company planned in 2007 to expand to Australia. Based in West London, the firm employed over 800 staff in 2007.

Sales for 2016 were £308 million, with profits at £26.2m.

See also
 List of companies based in London

References

External links
 

Companies based in the London Borough of Ealing
Mail-order retailers
Retail companies established in 1991
1991 establishments in England
Clothing brands of the United Kingdom